Shadows in Paradise may refer to:
 Shadows in Paradise (1986 film), a Finnish art house comedy-drama film
 Shadows in Paradise (2010 film), an American action film
 Shadows in Paradise (novel), a 1971 novel by Erich Maria Remarque